In probability theory and statistics, the noncentral chi distribution is a noncentral generalization of the chi distribution. It is also known as the generalized Rayleigh distribution.

Definition
If  are k independent, normally distributed random variables with means  and variances , then the statistic

is distributed according to the noncentral chi distribution.

Properties

Probability density function
The probability density function (pdf) is

where  is a modified Bessel function of the first kind.

Raw moments
The first few raw moments are:

where  is a Laguerre function.

Bivariate non-central chi distribution

Let , be a set of n independent and identically distributed bivariate normal random vectors with marginal distributions , correlation , and mean vector and covariance matrix

with  positive definite. Define

Then the joint distribution of U, V is central or noncentral bivariate chi distribution with n  degrees of freedom.
If either or both  or  the distribution is a noncentral bivariate chi distribution.

Related distributions
If  is a random variable with the non-central chi distribution, the random variable  will have the noncentral chi-squared distribution. Other related distributions may be seen there.
If  is chi distributed:  then  is also non-central chi distributed: . In other words, the chi distribution is a special case of the non-central chi distribution (i.e., with a non-centrality parameter of zero).
If X follows a noncentral chi distribution with 1 degree of freedom and noncentrality parameter λ, then σX follows a folded normal distribution whose parameters are equal to σλ and σ2 for any value of σ.

References

Continuous distributions
Noncentral distributions